Gardner Boyd Williams (April 16, 1877 in Jamaica Plain, Massachusetts – December 14, 1933 in Marblehead, Massachusetts) was an American freestyle swimmer.  He competed at the 1896 Summer Olympics in Athens. 

Williams competed in the 100 metre freestyle event.  His time and place are unknown, though he did not finish in the top two.  He also entered the 1200 metre freestyle competition, not placing in the top three of that event.

1896 Olympics freezing quote
One of his teammates related that in the swimming competition for the 1896 Olympics, he jumped in the water after spending all of his money on training and travel, only to quickly exit the water and exclaim, "I'm freezing." During the 1896 Olympics, the breezy weather had lowered the temperature to an estimated ,leading the athlete to withdraw from the race.

References

External links

1877 births
1933 deaths
American male freestyle swimmers
Olympic swimmers of the United States
Swimmers at the 1896 Summer Olympics
19th-century sportsmen
People from Jamaica Plain
Sportspeople from Boston